Dabakala is a town in northeast Ivory Coast. It is a sub-prefecture of and the seat of Dabakala Department in Hambol Region, Vallée du Bandama District. Dabakala is also a commune.

In 2021, the population of the sub-prefecture of Dabakala was 78,634.

Villages
The 25 villages of the sub-prefecture of Dabakala and their population in 2014 are:

Notes

Sub-prefectures of Hambol
Communes of Hambol